The Syria women's national football team is the representative women's association football team of Syria. Its governing body is the Syrian Football Association (SFA) and it competes as a member of the Asian Football Confederation (AFC). 

The national team's first activity was in 2005, when they participated in WAFF first-ever women's Championship. They made their first Asian cup qualifiers appearance in 2017 when they competed in Group D alongside Vietnam, Myanmar, Iran, and Singapore, they were quite unsuccessful as they finished last in the group losing all matches. As of December 2022, Syria is 157th in the FIFA Women's World Rankings.

Record per opponent
Key

The following table shows Syria's all-time official international record per opponent:

Last updated: Syria vs Lebanon, 4 September 2022. Statistics include official FIFA-recognised matches only.

Results
Legend

2005

2006

2007

2010

2011

2017

2022

See also
 Syria national football team results

References

External links
 Syria results on The Roon Ba

Results women
2000s in Syria
2010s in Syria
Women's national association football team results